Emina may refer to:

 Emina, feminine given name
 Emina Cunmulaj, Albanian-American model
 Emina Jahović, Serbian-Turkish singer of Bosniak ethnicity
 Emina Sefić, Bosnian woman who inspired the sevdalinka
 Emina Zečaj, Bosnian sevdalinka singer
 "Emina" (poem), Bosnian poem and sevdalinka